Yunus Social Business (YSB) is an impact-first organisation with a non-profit impact-investing arm, Yunus Funds, and a corporate social-innovation consulting arm, Yunus Corporate Innovation. Both business units are based on furthering the concept of social business, as developed by YSB Co-founder and Chairman Professor Muhammad Yunus. 

YSB was co-founded by Nobel Peace Laureate Muhammad Yunus, Saskia Bruysten and Sophie Eisenmann in 2011. Its stated mission is to "harness the power of business to end poverty and the climate crisis."

Background

History of social business 
Prior to co-founding Yunus Social Business, Muhammad Yunus pioneered the field of micro-finance through Grameen Bank in his home country of Bangladesh. Muhammad Yunus and Grameen Bank gained international acclaim when they jointly received the Nobel Peace Prize for establishing micro-finance and thus revealing a new means of tackling poverty. Grameen Bank became the first of several social businesses that Muhammad Yunus founded. With the term ‘social business,’ Prof Yunus’ approach was to take social and climate problems and create financially-sustainable business solutions. 

After the Grameen Bank was established, Muhammad Yunus began using the social-business approach to build other social businesses in Bangladesh. These included Grameen Shakti, a low-cost renewable-energy provider, and Grameen Eyecare Hospital, which provides health services at an affordable rate to low-income and less privileged populations.

Muhammad Yunus also began to create social-business joint ventures with corporations that were interested in bringing social value and innovation to their companies through the social-business mindset. One example was the French FMCG company Danone, with which Muhammad Yunus co-founded Grameen Danone Foods. The joint venture produced nutrition-enriched yoghurt at a minimal price to bring vital nutrients to underprivileged children in Bangladesh. Muhammad Yunus also worked on social-business joint ventures with BASF, Intel, Uniqlo, Euglena and G. Japan Sunpower Auto Limited.

Yunus Social Business history 
In 2008, Muhammad Yunus and future YSB co-founder Saskia Bruysten met at the London School of Economics, where Muhammad Yunus was giving a talk on the promise of social business. Inspired by the concept, Bruysten approached Muhammad Yunus after the talk and they exchanged contact information. This chance encounter led the former management consultant Bruysten to visit some of Muhammad Yunus’ social businesses -in Bangladesh. Bruysten then started setting up Grameen Creative Lab together with a German entrepreneur to promote the idea of social business, where her former BCG colleague Sophie Eisenmann later joined. In 2011, the trio agreed to co-found Yunus Social Business with the aim of supporting the development of social businesses in countries beyond Bangladesh.

Yunus Funds  
Yunus Funds is the non-profit impact-investing arm of Yunus Social Business. It provides patient loans and post-investment support to social businesses in Brazil, Colombia, India, Kenya, Rwanda and Uganda. Yunus Funds covers the sectors Agriculture and Livelihoods, Health and Sanitation, Education and Training and Energy and Environment. It supports social businesses that are early- to growth-stage.

Examples of social businesses financed by YSB

Tugende 
Tugende is a social business based in Uganda that offers motorcycle-taxi-drivers (boda boda drivers) the opportunity to rent their bike at an affordable rate and ultimately own their own motorcycle. After the bike has been fully paid off within 12-18 months, their daily incomes double on average from 5 USD to 10 USD. As of 2022, Tugende has served 52,000 customers. Yunus Social Business provided financing to Tugende in 2017. In 2021, Tugende went on to raise USD 9.9 million in Series A funding.

Impact Water 
Impact Water is a social business based in Uganda that provides affordable water-purification systems to schools, reducing the risks of water-borne diseases for children who attend the schools. As of 2022, Impact Water has installed water-purification systems at 32,517 schools, reaching 14.3 million students with safe drinking water. Impact Water entered YSB’s portfolio in 2015. Impact Water paid off its loan and left the YSB portfolio in 2022.

Yunus Corporate Innovation 

Yunus Corporate Innovation is the corporate social-innovation consulting arm of Yunus Social Business.

Yunus Corporate Innovation projects 
Some of the projects that Yunus Corporate Innovation has worked on include: the Fight for Access Accelerator Accelerator with Reckitt; the FLANE Accelerator for Female Entrepreneurship with Vodafone Institute; MAN Truck & Bus Impact Accelerator; the zero-waste social-business joint-venture Vishuddh with Cofresco of Melitta Group; the social-procurement initiative Micro Hub with IKEA Social Entrepreneurship; the social-procurement social-business joint-venture Campo Vivo with McCain.

Social intrapreneurship research: Business as Unusual 
Yunus Corporate Innovation has conducted qualitative and quantitative research into the business benefits of social intrapreneurship in collaboration with the World Economic Forum’s Schwab Foundation for Social Entrepreneurship, Porticus, INSEAD and HEC Paris. These include ‘Business as Unusual: How Social Intrapreneurs Can Turn Companies Into A Force For Good,’ ‘Business as Unusual: The Playbook for Designing Social Intrapreneurship Programmes’ and ‘Business as Unusual: Making the Case for Social Intrapreneurship.'

Social procurement research 
Yunus Corporate Innovation has conducted research into the business benefits of social procurement in collaboration with SAP and BCG. These include ‘The Social Procurement Manual’ and ‘A $500 Billion Market Opportunity for Real Impact at Scale.’

Country offices 
YSB is active in 6 countries with local offices in 5 including Brazil, Colombia, India, Kenya and Uganda.

YSB Brazil 
In March 2013, YSB Brazil was launched to spread the social business concept throughout Brazil, with Rio officially declared a ‘Social Business City’. Yunus Negocios Sociais Brasil, as it is locally known, ran three cycles of accelerator programs in São Paulo and Rio in 2014.

YSB Colombia 
YSB Colombia was created in 2011 originally as Grameen Caldas and officially became YSB Colombia in 2013. It currently manages a portfolio of 3 social businesses to date, including a joint venture with potato giant McCain.

YSB India 
YSB India was launched in 2011 in Mumbai, and 7 social businesses have received financing to date.

YSB Uganda 
In partnership with the African Development Bank, YSB Uganda began operations in November 2013, and the first local social businesses were supported in 2014.

Associated Countries 
YSB has previously been active in Albania, Tunisia and Haiti. These associated offices continue to operate, however YSB is no longer actively investing in these geographies.

Notable Partnerships

COVID Alliance for Social Entrepreneur 
In 2020, YSB together with the World Economic Forum co-initiated the COVID Alliance for Social Entrepreneurship in response to the challenges faced by social entrepreneurs during the COVID-19 pandemic. The initiative brought together 100 social-impact organisations to bring attention and support to social businesses. The Alliance argued that, as social businesses already work with vulnerable populations, they were well-placed to provide support to these vulnerable populations during the COVID-19 pandemic, particularly in countries where government support was otherwise delayed or unavailable:“Members of the Alliance commit to and call on their peers to stand by social entrepreneurs in their capacity as front-line responders to the health crisis and as pioneers of a green, inclusive society and economic system” - World Economic Forum

Unusual Pioneers 
Unusual Pioneers is a social-intrapreneurship accelerator for corporations. It was co-initiated in 2021 by Yunus Social Business, the World Economic Forum’s Schwab Foundation and Porticus. Participants of the 2021 cohort included social intrapreneurs representing Suez, Novartis, Unilever, Tata Trust, Accenture, ClubMed, Axa and Mastercard among others.

Take a Stake Consortium 
The Take a Stake Consortium is a funding initiative by Yunus Social Business and Waste Foundation, launched in 2021. The consortium has been joined by the Swedish International Development Cooperation Agency and IKEA Social Entrepreneurship. It aims to bring together sector expertise of all members to fund social businesses in the WASH and Waste sectors, initially in East Africa and India. Take a Stake thus aims to contribute towards closing a funding gap in the WASH and Waste sectors.

Social Success Note 
The Social Success Note was created by Yunus Funds, Rockefeller Foundation and UBS Optimus Foundation, aiming to bring financing to underfunded sectors and underserved customer populations. The Social Success Note is an outcome-based financing mechanism in which a commercial bank is incentivized  to lend to social businesses by a donor, who provides a grant to the commercial bank representing attractive market returns (in addition to the social business’ loan repayments) when the social business meets predefined social or climate objectives.

Core Partnerships 
BCG has been a core partner of Yunus Social Business since 2013. As part of the partnership, BCG has provided YSB with pro-bono consulting projects, created a secondee programme where BCG consultants can work for YSB and provided pro-bono consulting projects directly to YSB portfolio social businesses. YSB is one of BCG’s five global impact partnerships.

Freshfields has been a core partner of YSB since YSB was first legally incorporated in 2011. Since then, Freshfields has provided pro-bono legal services to YSB on an ongoing basis.

See also 
Muhammad Yunus
Yunus Centre
Social entrepreneur
Social enterprise
Impact Investing
Venture philanthropy
Social business
Grameen Danone
Corporate social entrepreneurship
Sustainable procurement
Sustainable Development Goals

References

External links 
 Joint article with Boston Consulting Group

Economic development organizations
International charities
Development charities based in Germany
Social enterprises
Berlin
Social economy